Çaydere can refer to:

 Çaydere, Bozüyük
 Çaydere, Pazaryolu